Dendroolithus is an oogenus of Dendroolithid dinosaur egg found in the late Cenomanian Chichengshan Formation (Tiantai Group), in the Gong-An-Zhai and Santonian Majiacun Formations of China and the Maastrichtian Nemegt and Campanian Barun Goyot Formation of Mongolia. They can be up to 162 mm long and 130 mm wide. These eggs may have been laid by a Therizinosaur, Sauropod, or Ornithopod. The oospecies "D." shangtangensis was originally classified as Dendroolithus, however, it has since been moved to its own distinct oogenus, Similifaveoloolithus. This oogenus is related with embryos of the theropod Torvosaurus

References

Dinosaur reproduction
Egg fossils
Cenomanian life
Santonian life
Campanian life
Maastrichtian life
Late Cretaceous dinosaurs of Asia
Cretaceous China
Fossils of China
Cretaceous Mongolia
Fossils of Mongolia
Barun Goyot Formation
Nemegt Formation
Fossil parataxa described in 1988